In geometry, the parabiaugmented hexagonal prism is one of the Johnson solids. As the name suggests, it can be constructed by doubly augmenting a hexagonal prism by attaching square pyramids to two of its nonadjacent, parallel (opposite) equatorial faces. Attaching the pyramids to nonadjacent, nonparallel equatorial faces yields a metabiaugmented hexagonal prism. (The solid obtained by attaching pyramids to adjacent equatorial faces is not convex, and thus not a Johnson solid.)

External links
 

Johnson solids